In American football, a nickelback is a cornerback or safety who serves as the additional defensive back in a nickel defense.  A base defense consists of two cornerbacks and two safeties, making the nickelback the fifth defensive back on the field, thus tying the name of the position to the name of the North American 5-cent piece.

Usually the nickelback will take the place of a linebacker, so if the team had been in a 4–3 formation, the four defensive linemen would remain, alongside only two linebackers and now-five defensive backs, creating a 4-2-5 formation. However, some teams will replace a lineman rather than a linebacker, creating a three linemen, three linebacker and five defensive back alignment, a 3–3–5 formation. If an offensive team always uses three or more wide receivers, a defense may turn to a nickel defense for their base package on most plays. Usually extra defensive backs, such as a nickelback, are substituted into the defense in situations where the opposing offense is likely to attempt a forward pass, such as 3rd-and-long, or when extra receivers are substituted into the opposing offense.

The nickelback is the third cornerback or safety on the depth chart. The nickelback is generally not considered a starting position because the starting formations for most defenses are either a 3-4 or a 4-3, in which only two cornerbacks and two safeties are utilized.  Defensive formations with three or more cornerbacks (or three safeties) are used often enough that a nickelback will usually see moderate playing time (particularly in the modern, pass-oriented NFL) as well as subbing in for the starting corners.  In certain packages (or if injuries depleted the depth chart), smaller free safeties or strong safeties can fill the spot of nickelback, as well.  Their role may become that of a pass rusher from outside the box.

In Canadian football or CFL, where five defensive backs are considered the norm, the position is known as a defensive halfback.

American football positions